Bosstown is an unincorporated community located on U.S. Route 14 in the south-central part of the town of Sylvan in Richland County, Wisconsin, United States. The community was apparently named for shopkeeper and livestock dealer William H. Dosch who was popularly known as "Boss" Dosch.

References

Unincorporated communities in Wisconsin
Unincorporated communities in Richland County, Wisconsin